The Stasi Records Agency was the organisation that administered the archives of Ministry of State Security (Stasi) of the former German Democratic Republic (East Germany). It was a government agency of the Federal Republic of Germany. It was established when the Stasi Records Act came into force on 29 December 1991. Formally it was called the Federal Commissioner for the Records of the State Security Service of the former German Democratic Republic; the official German abbreviation was BStU. On June 17, 2021, the BStU was absorbed into the German Federal Archives (Bundesarchiv).

The Stasi was established on 8 February 1950. It functioned as the GDR's secret police, intelligence agency and crime investigation service. It grew to have around 270,000 people working for it, including about 180,000 informers, or "unofficial collaborators". It was renamed the "Office for National Security" on 17 November 1989. It was dissolved on 13 January 1990.

The Stasi spied on almost every aspect of East Germans' daily lives, and it carried out international espionage. It kept files on about 5.6 million people and amassed an enormous archive. The archive holds  of files in total. About half of the material is held in the Stasi Records Agency's headquarters in Berlin, and the rest is in its 12 regional offices. As well as written documentation, the archive has audio-visual material such as photos, slides, film, and sound recordings. The Stasi also had an archive of sweat and body odour samples which its officers collected during interrogations.

Name
The agency was formally known by the title of its lead official, the "Federal Commissioner for the Records of the State Security Service of the former German Democratic Republic". Due to the unwieldy name, the Commissioner was usually referred to as the "Federal Commissioner for Stasi Records" (German: Der Bundesbeauftragte für die Stasi-Unterlagen), abbreviated as "BStU". The agency itself was commonly referred to using the last name of the sitting federal commissioner, i.e. "Gauck-", "Birthler-", and "Jahn Agency".

It has also been called the Stasi-Unterlagen-Behörde ("Stasi Records Agency" ).

Organisation
 The former head office of the Stasi Records Agency was in the central suburb of Lichtenberg in Berlin, in what was part of the sprawling former Stasi headquarters compound. In addition to providing access to files, it also has exhibitions, tours and public events related to the Stasi and the history of the GDR.

There were also 12 regional offices of the organisation in Dresden, Erfurt, Frankfurt-an-der-Oder, and Halle, Chemnitz, Gera, Leipzig, Magdeburg, New Brandenburg, Rostock, Schwerin and Suhl.

The offices in Dresden, Erfurt, Frankfurt-an-der-Oder and Halle all had permanent and changing exhibitions, offer tours to the public and host events and educational programmes relating to the activities of the Stasi in their region.

The agency was a member of the Platform of European Memory and Conscience, an organisation founded in October 2011 which brings together public and private institutions in 20 countries which focus on history of the totalitarian regimes in 20th century Europe

Federal Commissioners
The agency is headed by a Federal Commissioner, elected by the Bundestag.
 Joachim Gauck (1991–2000)
 Marianne Birthler (2000–2011)
 Roland Jahn (2011–2021)

History

After the Central Committee of the Socialist Unity Party stepped down on 3 December 1989, the Stasi became the last bastion of the dictatorship. Citizens were alert to the fact that the Stasi might try to destroy files and records, in order to cover up its activities. On the morning of 4 December, dark smoke was seen coming from the chimneys of the Stasi district headquarters in Erfurt, and it was deduced that files were being burned. With the help of other citizens, a women's group, "Women for Change" (German: Frauen für Veränderung) occupied the building and the neighbouring Stasi remand prison, where they stored files for safekeeping.

This instigated the take over of Stasi buildings all over East Germany. Citizens gained access to the Stasi headquarters in Berlin on 15 January 1990.

After German Reunification in October 1990, Joachim Gauck was appointed Special Commissioner for the Stasi Records. When Stasi Records Act was passed in December 1991, he became first Federal Commissioner for the Stasi Records, heading the newly created Stasi Records Agency. The act sets out the rights of people to view Stasi Records, which they were first able to do on 2 January 1992. 

As at January 2015, over 7 million people had applied to view their own Stasi files. In January 2015 the Stasi Records Agency created a digital portal and made files available online, although for privacy reasons no files of living people are available digitally. The website includes information about the 1953 uprising in East Germany and the events leading to the fall of the Berlin Wall.

Controversy
Controversy arose after an investigation, whose report had been leaked to the media, found out that the BStU at one point employed at least 79 former Stasi members and still employed 52 as of 2009. The great majority of these were hired from the "bodyguards" branch of the Stasi; some were former archivists and some were just technicians. There was suspicion that some of these former Stasi officers managed to manipulate records, so a rule was put in place that no former Stasi officers are allowed to enter the Stasi Archives by themselves. The report recommended, for several reasons besides the issue of former Stasi officers working for the BStU, to integrate the BStU into the German Federal Archives. It also reported there was a constitutionally questionable situation. In summer 2008, the German Parliament decided to found an expert commission to analyze the role and future of the BStU.

Reconstruction of shredded files
In 1995, the Stasi Archives began reassembling documents that had been shredded by Stasi staff before citizens had been able to protect them. There were nearly 16,000 bags of shredded material; an estimated 33 million pages. The project to reassemble them is ongoing. This work has mainly been done by hand but since 2007 specially developed computer technology has been used to help with the project.

Rosenholz files
The Rosenholz files are a collection of microfilmed Stasi files that have information on East Germany's foreign intelligence service employees and informers. They contain 320,000 agent cards and 57,000 spy reports. They were acquired by the CIA shortly after the fall of the Berlin Wall in unclear circumstances.  Between 2001 and 2003 the United States gave the files it had, which were on 380 CD-ROMs, to the Stasi Records Agency. Since July 2003, these been available for viewing. They provide an insight into the Stasi's spying activities in western countries. They have been used to identify Stasi spies and informers, including Lothar Bisky, the chairman of the Party of Democratic Socialism and its successor Party of The Left.

The CIA passed on some of the material to the United Kingdom and other countries. In 2011, the German government asked the UK's MI5 to return the files they have, but they refused due to concerns that British Stasi spies could be exposed.

See also

 Memorial and Education Centre Andreasstraße

References

Further reading

External links

  (in English)
  via Al Jazeera English
 Stasi Mediathek The Stasi Records Agency's Online Archive (in German)
 Stasi records used in a witness report of a former Stasi prisoner: Stasi Prison - with original Stasi records 1985-1986

German federal agencies
Archives in Germany
Stasi
History of East Germany
Mass surveillance by country
Platform of European Memory and Conscience
Privacy in Germany
History organisations based in Germany
-